Eva Malin Ingegärd Fredin (also spelled as Ingegerd, 27 October 1930 – 18 June 2020) was a Swedish freestyle swimmer who won a bronze medal in the 4 × 100 m relay at the  1950 European Aquatics Championships. She competed at the 1948 and 1952 Olympics in the 100 m, 400 m and 4 × 100 m events with the best result of fifth place in the 100 m in 1948.

References

1930 births
2020 deaths
Swedish female freestyle swimmers
Olympic swimmers of Sweden
Swimmers at the 1948 Summer Olympics
Swimmers at the 1952 Summer Olympics
European Aquatics Championships medalists in swimming
SK Neptun swimmers